A & F Harvey Brothers, first Spinning Cotton Mill, established by Scottish brothers Andrew Harvey and  Frank Harvey, in the year 1880.

Early history 
A & F Harvey Brothers were born in the year 1850 and 1854, respectively, in a farmer family in Scotland. They traveled to India during 19th century and landed in Madras. They started the business of bailing cotton and established the first cotton press mill in Virudupatti, near Tuticorin. They started export business in cotton. In 1940's Andrew started a Hydro Electric project in Papanasam. Frank died in 1905 and Andrew died in the year 1915, and their memorial was inaugurated by Sir James Doak, the then Managing Director at Ambasamudram in 1949

List of mills
1880 - A & F Harvey Cotton Press in Virudupatti
1885 - Tinnevelly Mills Ltd now called as Thirunelvelli
Coral Mills in Tuticorin, India
Madura Mills in Madurai

References

Cotton mills